Bakothi is a village and Gram panchayat in Bilhaur Tehsil, Kanpur Nagar district, Uttar Pradesh, India.According to census 2011 total Population of the village is 787 which has 392 males and 395 females. It is located 66 km away from Kanpur City. Village code is 149927.

References

Villages in Kanpur Nagar district
Kanpur Dehat district